Local elections were held in Zamboanga City on May 13, 2013, within the Philippine general election. The voters elected for the elective local posts in the city: the mayor, vice mayor, and eight councilors per district.

Summary
Two main coalitions posied for the control of Zamboanga City beginning mid-2012:
The Adelante Zamboanga Party (AZAP) headed by incumbent Mayor Celso Lobregat; and
The Zamboangueños for the Transformation of Zamboanga (ZTZ) headed by former Zamboanga del Norte congressman Romeo Jalosjos.

LP-LDP-AZAP
The AZAP coalition is composed of the local party itself and the local chapters of the Laban ng Demokratikong Pilipino and of the Liberal Party.
Incumbent District II Representative Erico Basilio Fabian is term-bounded and cannot run for another term and is poised to run for the mayorship in the next elections. But the party endorsed, with the initiative of Mayor Lobregat, incumbent District I Representative Beng Climaco for the mayorship.

The Split
Felt being junked by his former partymates in Lobregat's camp, Fabian decided to run against Climaco-Salazar under the banner of a new party, the Fuerza Zamboanga. Lobregat denied Fabian's allegations citing that Fabian confirmed that he will not run for a new post and consider retirement.

ZTZ-UNA
By the start of June 2012, former Zamboanga del Norte congressman Romeo Jalosjos announced his bid for the mayoralty in Zamboanga City. He then started to establish a non-government organization known as the Zamboangueños for the Transformation of Zamboanga (ZTZ) with a 25-point agenda aimed at transforming Zamboanga City with progress and development.

The United Nationalist Alliance fielded Jalosjos to chair the UNA local chapter in the city and Zamboanga del Norte.

Disqualification Case
Representative Beng Climaco and Jomar Lobregat, the Mayor's brother filed a disqualification case against Jalosjos citing that he didn't meet the one year residency requirement. He is also questioned that he is not qualified because of his conviction in a rape case in 1997 while he served in Congress.

On January 15, 2013, the Commission on Elections disqualified Jalosjos alongside his brother, Dominador Jalosjos who is also a candidate for governor of Zamboanga del Sur for violating the Local Government Code of 1991 which bars ex-convicts to run for office and run short of the required one-year residency in the place where a candidate can run.

Retiring and term-limited elective officials
 Celso Lobregat, incumbent mayor, term-limited in 2013
 Erico Basilio Fabian, incumbent District II Representative, term-limited in 2013
 Rodoflo Lim, incumbent District I councilor, term-limited in 2013
 Benjamin Guingona III, incumbent District II councilor, term-limited in 2013
 Reyniero Candido, incumbent District II councilor, term-limited in 2013

Candidates
Notes:
 bold means the candidate is incumbent and running for reelection;
 italic means the candidate previously run last 2010 election either on the same post or other posts;
 bold and italic means the candidate is an incumbent and is running for another position.

Results
The candidates for district representative, mayor, and vice mayor with the highest number of votes wins the seat; they are voted separately, therefore, they may be of different parties when elected.

House of Representatives election

1st District
Incumbent Maria Isabelle Climaco Salazar is not running; she is running for the mayorship instead; Incumbent Mayor Celso Lobregat is her party's nominee under the coalition of LDP-LP-AZAP.

The UNA-ZTZ coalition fielded former Monsignor Crisanto dela Cruz for the post. Dela Cruz previously run for the mayorship in 2007 and for the vice-mayorship in 2010. This will be the second time where Dela Cruz and Mayor Lobregat will go against each other as they have last 2007 mayoral elections.

2nd District
Incumbent Erico Basilio Fabian is term limited and running for the mayorship instead. He then formed a local coalition known as Fuerza Zamboanga yielding District II Councilor Lilia Nuño to replace him.

The AZAP coalition nominates Mayor Lobregat's brother, Jose Lobregat, to run for the post.

The ZTZ coalition recruited former City Vice-Mayor Mannix Dalipe to run for the post.

Mayoral elections
Incumbent Mayor Celso Lobregat is his third consecutive term and is barred to run for another term. He ran for Congress representing the First Legislative District.

Vice-mayoral elections
Incumbent Vice-Mayor Cesar Iturralde is running for reelection against former Councilor Luis Climaco and former Dapitan councilor Mercy Arquiza-Fernandez.

City Council elections
Each of Zamboanga City's two legislative districts elects eight councilors to the City Council. The eight candidates with the highest number of votes wins the seats per district.

1st District

|- style="background-color:#E9E9E9"
! # !!align=left style="width: 300px"|Candidate !!align=left width=140px|Coalition
!width=100px align=left colspan=2|Party !!width=100px|Votes !!width=50px|% !!width=60px|Swing
|-style="background: #FFFFCC; font-weight:bold;"
|1 ||width=200px align=left|Melchor Sadain (incumbent) ||align=left|Fuerza Zamboanga
| || 55,984 || % || 
|-style="background: #FFFFCC; font-weight:bold;"
|2 ||align=left|Rogelio Valesco, Jr. (incumbent) ||align=left|Team PNoy
| || 53,979 || % ||
|-style="background: #FFFFCC; font-weight:bold;"
|3 ||align=left|Cesar Jimenez, Jr. (incumbent) ||align=left|not affiliated
| || 52,873 || % || 
|-style="background: #FFFFCC; font-weight:bold;"
|4 ||align=left|Charlie Mariano ||align=left|Team PNoy
| || 51,277 || % ||
|-style="background: #FFFFCC; font-weight:bold;"
|5 ||align=left|Luis Biel III (incumbent) ||align=left|Team PNoy
| || 49,798 || % ||
|-style="background: #FFFFCC; font-weight:bold;"
|6 ||align=left|Josephine Pareja ||align=left|not affiliated
| || 47,798 || % ||
|-style="background: #FFFFCC; font-weight:bold;"
|7 ||align=left|Myra Paz Valderrosa-Abubakar (incumbent) ||align=left|Team PNoy
| || 46,691 || % || 
|-style="background: #FFFFCC; font-weight:bold;"
|8 ||align=left|Rodolfo Bayot (incumbent) ||align=left|UNA
| || 45,691 || % ||
|-
|bgcolor=black colspan=8|
|-
|9 ||align=left|Jaime Cabato (incumbent) ||align=left|UNA
| || 45,564 || % || 
|-
|10 ||align=left|Elbert Atilano ||align=left|Team PNoy
| || 41,222  || % ||
|-
|11 ||align=left|Hado Edding ||align=left|Fuerza Zamboanga
| || 24,724 || % ||
|-
|12 ||align=left|Ahmad Sampang ||align=left|Team PNoy
| || 23,902 || % || 
|-
|13 ||align=left|Tito Espiritusanto ||align=left|Team PNoy
| || 21,805 || % ||
|-
|14 ||align=left|Antonio Blanco ||align=left|UNA
| || 15,021 || %||
|-
|15 ||align=left|Violeta Alejandro ||align=left|Team PNoy
|| || align=left | AZAP || 12,911 || % ||
|-
|16 ||align=left|Alexis Ortega ||align=left|UNA
| || 12,653  || %||
|-
|17 ||align=left|Jarah Bernardo Romuar || align=left|UNA
| || 10,791 || %||
|-
|18 ||align=left|Joselito Bernardo ||align=left|Fuerza Zamboanga
| || 10,702 || % ||
|-
|19 ||align=left|Miguel Apostol ||align=left|Fuerza Zamboanga
| || 10,171 || % ||
|-
|20 ||align=left|Jerson Monteverde ||align=left|UNA
| || 8,085 || % ||
|-
|21 ||align=left|Armando Bucoy ||align=left|Not affiliated
| || 6,215 || % ||
|-
|22 ||align=left|Marlon Torres ||align=left|UNA
|  || 6,142 || % ||
|-
|23 ||align=left|Khymer Olaso ||align=left|Not affiliated
| || 4,936 || % ||
|-
|24 ||align=left|Rowland Bella || align=left|UNA
|  || 3,879 || % ||
|-
|25 ||align=left|Rizaldy Montebon ||align=left|Not affiliated
| || 3,760 || % ||
|-
|26 ||align=left|Dominador Managula || align=left|Not affiliated
| || 1,717 || % ||
|-style="background-color:#E9E9E9; font-weight:bold"
|colspan=5|Certificates of canvass already canvassed ||  || ||
|-style="background-color:#E9E9E9; font-weight:bold"
|colspan=5|Total turnout ||  ||  ||  1.29%
|-style="background-color:#E9E9E9; font-weight:bold"
|colspan=5|Total votes ||  || N/A ||
|-style="background-color:#E9E9E9; font-weight:bold"
|colspan=5|Registered voters || ||  ||  2.80%
|}

2nd District

|- style="background-color:#E9E9E9"
! # !!align=left style="width: 300px"|Candidate !!align=left width=140px|Coalition
!width=100px align=left colspan=2|Party !!width=100px|Votes !!width=50px|% !!width=60px|Swing
|-style="background: #FFFFCC; font-weight:bold;"
|1 ||width=200px align=left|Roel Natividad ||align=left|Team PNoy
| || 53,968 || 8.41% || 
|-style="background: #FFFFCC; font-weight:bold;"
|2 ||align=left|Benjamin Guingona IV ||align=left|Team PNoy
| || 49,696 || 6.93% ||
|-style="background: #FFFFCC; font-weight:bold;"
|3 ||align=left|Miguel Alavar III (incumbent) ||align=left|Team PNoy
| || 43,955 || 6.74% || 
|-style="background: #FFFFCC; font-weight:bold;"
|4 ||align=left|Eduardo Saavedra, Jr. (incumbent) ||align=left|Team PNoy
| || 42,792 || 6.57% ||
|-style="background: #FFFFCC; font-weight:bold;"
|5 ||align=left|Juan Climaco Elago II ||align=left|UNA
| || 42,653 || 6.73% || 
|-style="background: #FFFFCC; font-weight:bold;"
|6 ||align=left|Percival Ramos (incumbent)||align=left|Team PNoy
| || 38,494 || 5.74% ||
|-style="background: #FFFFCC; font-weight:bold;"
|7 ||align=left|Rommel Agan (incumbent) ||align=left|UNA
| || 37,514 || 6.09% ||
|-style="background: #FFFFCC; font-weight:bold;"
|8 ||align=left|Vincent Paul Elago (incumbent) ||align=left|Team PNoy
|| ||align=left|AZAP|| 36,213 || 5.66% || 
|-
|bgcolor=black colspan=8|
|-
|9 ||align=left|John Dalipe ||align=left|UNA
| || 35,506 || 5.57% || 
|-
|10 ||align=left|Francisco Barredo ||align=left|Team PNoy
| || 34,372 || 5.34% ||
|-
|11 ||align=left|Al-Jihan Edding ||align=left|UNA
| || 35,227 || 5.34% ||
|-
|12 ||align=left|Susan delos Reyes ||align=left|UNA
| || 29,083 || 4.52% || 
|-
|13 ||align=left|Gerasimo Acuña ||align=left|Fuerza Zamboanga
| || 25,537 || 4.05% ||
|-
|14 ||align=left|Arturo Onrubia ||align=left|Team PNoy
| || 24,612 || 3.93%||
|-
|15 ||align=left|Frederick Atilano ||align=left|Not affiliated
| || 14,538 || 2.28% ||
|-
|16 ||align=left|Abubakar Hakim || align=left|Not affiliated
| || 11,545 || 1.66% ||
|-
|17 ||align=left|Basilio Apolinario VII ||align=left|Fuerza Zamboanga
| || 11,484 || 1.68% ||
|-
|18 ||align=left|Loemyr Toribio||align=left|UNA
| || 10,901 || 1.57% ||
|-
|19 ||align=left|Roseller Enriquez ||align=left|Fuerza Zamboanga
| || 10,828 || 1.77% ||
|-
|20 ||align=left|Resurrecion Miravite ||align=left|UNA
| || 9,848 || 1.58% ||
|-
|21 ||align=left|John David Corpin ||align=left|Not affiliated
| || 9,621 || 1.45% ||
|-
|22 ||align=left|Mohammadnur Ajihil ||align=left|UNA
|  || 8,641 || 1.28% ||
|-
|23 ||align=left|Antonio Feliciano ||align=left|Fuerza Zamboanga
| || 5,357 || 0.88% ||
|-
|24 ||align=left|Carlito Depositario ||align=left|Fuerza Zamboanga
| || 5,200 || 0.85% ||
|-
|25 ||align=left|Nulhamdo Cegales || align=left|Not affiliated 
|  || 4,817 || 0.70% ||
|-
|26 ||align=left|Bahari Camlian || align=left|Not affiliated
| || 4,739 || 0.69% ||
|-
|27 ||align=left|Hussayin Apra || align=left|Not affiliated
|  || 4,526 || 0.66% ||
|-
|28 ||align=left|Eduardo Mingala ||align=left|Fuerza Zamboanga
| || 4,127 || 0.58% ||
|-
|29 ||align=left|Quirino Aba ||align=left|Not affiliated
| || 2,743 || 0.41% ||
|-
|30 ||align=left|Christopher Miguel, Sr. || align=left|Not affiliated
| || 2,153 || 0.32% ||
|-
|-style="background-color:#E9E9E9; font-weight:bold"
|colspan=5|Certificates of canvass already canvassed ||  || ||
|-style="background-color:#E9E9E9; font-weight:bold"
|colspan=5|Total turnout ||  ||  ||  1.29%
|-style="background-color:#E9E9E9; font-weight:bold"
|colspan=5|Total votes || 64,119 || N/A ||
|-style="background-color:#E9E9E9; font-weight:bold"
|colspan=5|Registered voters || ||  ||  2.80%
|}

Aftermath

Proclamation
As the election unofficial results found that Climaco was leading by a wide margin, Fabian announced his concession and congratulates Climaco for winning the election. “I concede defeat and I would like to congratulate my dear friend Beng Climaco,” Fabian said in a press statement.
On May 14, 2013, Climaco was proclaimed winner by the City Board of Canvassers in the mayoralty elections. She also laid out her plans for the city which includes the solution to solve the city power crisis and the peace and order situation.

District II Representative-elect Lilia Macrohon-Nuño also urged the people of Zamboanga to move on and discuss what is best for the city.
She also revived the issue of creating a third congressional district for the city in which the city has more than 770,000 people. According to the 1987 Philippine Constitution, each district shall represent 250,000. Currently, the city is represented twice in the House of Representatives. A previous move by then Congresswoman Climaco was made by filing a bill to Congress creating the said district but was blocked by the majority of the members of Zamboanga City Council.

Cabato electoral protest
After the proclamation of all the councilors of District I, outgoing incumbent Councilor Jaime Cabato who landed on the 8th spot announced his intention to file an electoral protest against his own partymate, Rudy Bayot who landed on the 7th spot and against the administration party bet, Myra Paz Valderrosa. Cabato was a former member of the administration-led party, the Laban ng Demokratikong Pilipino until he switched sides with then mayoralty candidate, Romeo Jalosjos citing the fact that he disagreed with the candidate line-up of the LDP.

Taluksangay issue
Jose Augustus Villano, chairman of the Zamboanga chapter of Legal Network for Peaceful Election (LENTE), said his group found that of the 847 registered person with disabilities (PWDs) voters in Zamboanga City, 505 or almost 60 percent are from Barangay Taluksangay. Taluksangay is under the control of the Nuños which Lilia, one of its powerful members won the congressional race in District II.

Villano himself observed voting at the five clustered precincts of Taluksangay. He immediately noticed that almost all voters, whether they appeared to have a disability or not, were helped by a small group of people stationed inside the precinct. When Villalon asked election officers about them, he was told they were “liners” there to assist PWDs. LENTE records show that 80 to 90 percent of all who voted were assisted. Villano thinks that the people assisted might have been illiterate rather than PWDs. “I asked them in both Tagalog and in the native dialect Tausug and they understood. I asked them who they want to vote for and they pointed at the names.” When he asked the voters how they were related to the “liners,” they replied, “Sila ang magvo-vote para sa amin (They were the ones who voted for us).” When Villano told the election officers that this was illegal, the Board of Election Inspectors replied that she cannot assist the voters herself because she is "busy".

Despite its small voting population, Taluksangay was a point of contention during the campaign period. Jomar Lobregat’s party, Adelante Zamboanga, claims that they were not allowed to post their materials in there. In a news item in Zamboanga Times on April 14, Adelante Zamboanga team coordinator Rudy Lim said that when he asked Taluksangay barangay chairman Abdurahman Nuño if they can conduct a meeting in Taluksangay, Nuño replied, “No deal."

Abdurahman Nuño is the husband of Lilia and sits on the city council ex-officio and is president of the Association of Barangay Captains.

See also
Philippine House of Representatives elections in the Zamboanga Peninsula, 2013
2013 Philippine general election

References

External links
Official website of the Commission on Elections
 Official website of National Movement for Free Elections (NAMFREL)
Official website of the Parish Pastoral Council for Responsible Voting (PPCRV)

2013 Philippine local elections
Elections in Zamboanga City